Fawn Lake Township is a township in Todd County, Minnesota, United States. The population was 440 at the 2000 census.

Fawn Lake Township was organized in 1881.

Geography

Demographics
As of the census of 2000, there were 440 people, 174 households, and 128 families residing in the township.  The population density was 12.9 people per square mile (5.0/km2).  There were 225 housing units at an average density of 6.6/sq mi (2.6/km2).  The racial makeup of the township was 96.59% White, 0.23% African American, 0.23% Asian, 0.23% Pacific Islander, 1.14% from other races, and 1.59% from two or more races. Hispanic or Latino of any race were 2.05% of the population.

There were 174 households, out of which 28.7% had children under the age of 18 living with them, 59.8% were married couples living together, 8.0% had a female householder with no husband present, and 26.4% were non-families. 22.4% of all households were made up of individuals, and 5.7% had someone living alone who was 65 years of age or older.  The average household size was 2.53 and the average family size was 2.93.

In the township the population was spread out, with 25.0% under the age of 18, 7.0% from 18 to 24, 27.7% from 25 to 44, 25.0% from 45 to 64, and 15.2% who were 65 years of age or older.  The median age was 39 years. For every 100 females, there were 104.7 males.  For every 100 females age 18 and over, there were 108.9 males.

The median income for a household in the township was $33,646, and the median income for a family was $45,469. Males had a median income of $30,000 versus $16,875 for females. The per capita income for the township was $15,559.  About 5.9% of families and 10.9% of the population were below the poverty line, including 12.7% of those under age 18 and 10.3% of those age 65 or over.

References

Townships in Todd County, Minnesota
Townships in Minnesota